Tranmere Rovers F.C. played the 1931–32 season in the Football League Third Division North. It was their 11th season of league football, and they finished 4th of 21. They reached the Third Round of the FA Cup.

Football League

References 

Tranmere Rovers F.C. seasons